Kittanning ( pronounced ) is a borough in  and the county seat of Armstrong County, Pennsylvania, United States. The population was 3,921 at the 2020 census.

The name is derived from Kithanink, which means 'on the main river' in Lenape or the Delaware language, from kit- 'big' + hane 'mountain river' + -ink (suffix used in place names). "The main river" is a Lenape term for the Allegheny and Ohio combined, which they considered as all one river. The borough and its bridge have been used as a setting for several recent films.

History

The borough is located on the east bank of the Allegheny River, founded on the site of the eighteenth-century Lenape (Delaware) village of Kittanning at the western end of the Kittanning Path, an ancient Native American path.

In 1756, the village was destroyed by John Armstrong, Sr. at the Battle of Kittanning during the French and Indian War. During the attack, a blast from the explosion of gunpowder stored in Captain Jacobs's house was heard at Fort Duquesne, present day Pittsburgh, Pennsylvania, 44 miles away.

Kittanning was designated as the seat of Armstrong County when the county was organized. It was settled by European Americans largely after the American Revolutionary War, although Anthony Sadowski (also recorded by the anglicized name of Sandusky), a prominent Polish-American trader, and other Native American traders operated here before the Revolutionary War.

During the American Civil War, the 103rd Regiment of Pennsylvania Infantry volunteers was organized at Kittanning from September 7, 1861 - February 22, 1862. Among other engagements, the unit participated in the Siege of Yorktown (1862) as well as the Battle of Plymouth (1864), during which most of the regiment was captured.

By the early in the 20th century, the city had developed considerable industry: large iron and steel works, foundries, and coal mines, all associated with the steel and iron industries of Pittsburgh; glassworks, flour and lumber mills; china, pottery, brick, lime, and clay works; and mirror and typewriter factories, breweries, etc. It reached its peak of population in 1930 and was adversely affected by the Great Depression. After World War II, changes in industry and restructuring of heavy industry caused a loss of jobs in many of these works, with an associated population decline.

The playground on North Jefferson Street was developed on the former site of the historic Kittanning Cemetery. In order to enable this, the city moved 274 graves in 1960 to a new cemetery formed along Troy Hill Road.

In 1900, 3,902 people lived in Kittanning, and in 1910, there were 4,311 inhabitants. After Kittanning merged with Wickboro (1910 population 2,775), in 1914, the population was estimated at 10,000, which was likely high. The 1920 census counted 7,153 residents. In 1930, there were 7,808 residents; in 1940, 7,550. Since late 20th century industrial decline, the population was 4,044 at the 2010 census.

The Allegheny River Lock and Dam No. 7 and Armstrong County Courthouse and Jail are each listed on the National Register of Historic Places.

Geography

Kittanning is located at  (40.820085, -79.521398).

Demographics

As of the census of 2000, there were 4,787 people, 2,032 households, and 1,117 families residing in the borough. The population density was 4,615.2 people per square mile (1,777.2/km²). There were 2,251 housing units at an average density of 2,170.2 per square mile (835.7/km²). The racial makeup of the borough was 97.31% White, 1.57% African American, 0.23% Native American, 0.25% Asian, 0.08% from other races, and 0.56% from two or more races. Hispanic or Latino of any race were 0.67% of the population.

There were 2,032 households, out of which 26.2% had children under the age of 18 living with them, 36.7% were married couples living together, 14.9% had a female householder with no husband present, and 45.0% were non-families. 40.5% of all households were made up of individuals, and 19.4% had someone living alone who was 65 years of age or older. The average household size was 2.19 and the average family size was 2.96.

The borough median age of 40 years was the same as the county median age. The distribution by age group was 22.2% under the age of 18, 10.4% from 18 to 24, 27.1% from 25 to 44, 20.3% from 45 to 64, and 20.1% who were 65 years of age or older. The median age was 40 years. For every 100 females, there were 82.5 males. For every 100 females age 18 and over, there were 78.2 males.

The median income for a household in the borough was $20,921, and the median income for a family was $30,822. Males had a median income of $29,036 versus $20,040 for females. The per capita income for the borough was $13,787. About 12.3% of families and 16.4% of the population were below the poverty line, including 14.8% of those under age 18 and 11.7% of those age 65 or over.

Electricity
 Armstrong Power Plant

Education

Public Schools 
All public schools in the Kittanning attendance area are a part of the Armstrong School District.

Library 
The Kittanning Public Library was established in 1923 as the Kittanning Free Library. As of 2020, the library had 4,189 registered users and circulated 10,930 items in that fiscal year.  The library is one of six independent libraries in Armstrong County, and is supported by the New Castle Library District.

Media

Newspapers
 Leader Times
 The Kittanning Paper

In popular culture 

Several popular movies and televisions programs have been filmed in Kittanning.

The original bridge over the Allegheny River at Kittanning was torn down and replaced with the Kittanning Citizens Bridge, which was built higher above ground level to avoid flooding. Scenes with the town and bridge were the used in the film The Mothman Prophecies (2002) starring Richard Gere and Laura Linney, which was filmed in the Kittanning area.

Scenes for the 2009 horror movie My Bloody Valentine 3D were filmed in Kittanning.

The 2010 pilot episode for Justified, starring Timothy Olyphant, was filmed in Kittanning and its surrounding areas.

Filming for the movie One for the Money took place during Summer 2010.

The setting for three episodes of the Netflix original TV series Mindhunter is based in Altoona, but scenes were actually shot in and around Kittanning in January 2017.

In 2019 Netflix show Manhunt (the lone wolf), a second season of the show Manhunt, based on the 1996 Olympic bombings and the nationwide 5 year search of Eric Rudolph, was being filmed in Kittanning. The show is set to have a 2020 release date on Netflix.

Notable people
 Jason Altmire, U.S. Congressman
 Nick Bowers, NFL tight end for the Las Vegas Raiders
 Mitch Frerotte, former NFL player 
 Daniel Brodhead Heiner, U.S. Representative from Pennsylvania
 Ed Hobaugh, baseball player
 Teri Hope, actress and Playboy Playmate
 Ralph Patt, jazz guitarist
 Mickey Morandini, Baseball Player 
 Dick Starr, major league pitcher
 George L. Shoup, First governor of Idaho, United States senator

See also
 List of crossings of the Allegheny River
 List of towns and boroughs in Pennsylvania

References

External links
 Armstrong County Tourist Bureau website
 Carl's Kittanning.com website "since 1997"
 Downtown Kittanning Walking Tour as a photo essay.
 Kittanning Online – history of Kittanning and social networking site

 
County seats in Pennsylvania
Populated places established in 1724
Pittsburgh metropolitan area
Boroughs in Armstrong County, Pennsylvania
1724 establishments in Pennsylvania
Pennsylvania placenames of Native American origin